José Reis may refer to:

 José Reis (footballer) (born 1911), former Portuguese footballer
 José Reis (kickboxer) (born 1977), Portuguese Muay Thai kickboxer
 José Reis (politician), East Timorese politician
 José Reis (scientist) (1907–2002), Brazilian scientist, journalist and science writer